Josip Šoljić (born 18 June 1987) is a Croatian professional footballer who plays as a defensive midfielder for Polish club Kotwica Kołobrzeg.

Career

Club career
On 9 December 2019, Šoljić joined Polish I liga club Miedź Legnica on a deal until June 2022.

On 3 October 2020, he moved to Wigry Suwałki in Polish third-tier II liga.

References

External links
 
 Josip Šoljić profile at Nogometni Magazin 
 

1987 births
Living people
People from Gradačac
Croats of Bosnia and Herzegovina
Association football defenders
Croatian footballers
NK Zagreb players
NK Lučko players
NK Moslavina players
FC Gossau players
NK Rudeš players
FC Zbrojovka Brno players
FC Milsami Orhei players
NK Inter Zaprešić players
ACS Poli Timișoara players
Stal Mielec players
Miedź Legnica players
Wigry Suwałki players
Resovia (football) players
Kotwica Kołobrzeg footballers
Croatian Football League players
First Football League (Croatia) players
Swiss Challenge League players
Czech National Football League players
Czech First League players
Moldovan Super Liga players
Liga I players
I liga players
II liga players
Croatian expatriate footballers
Croatian expatriate sportspeople in Switzerland
Expatriate footballers in Switzerland
Croatian expatriate sportspeople in the Czech Republic
Expatriate footballers in the Czech Republic
Croatian expatriate sportspeople in Moldova
Expatriate footballers in Moldova
Croatian expatriate sportspeople in Romania
Expatriate footballers in Romania
Croatian expatriate sportspeople in Poland
Expatriate footballers in Poland